Hard Cash is an unincorporated community in Elbert County, Georgia, United States.

In 1894, the settlement was noted as a stop on the Southern Railway.

References

Unincorporated communities in Elbert County, Georgia
Unincorporated communities in Georgia (U.S. state)